Volkhart Buchter (born 26 June 1944) is a German rower who represented West Germany. He competed at the 1968 Summer Olympics in Mexico City with the men's coxless four where they came sixth.

References

1944 births
Living people
German male rowers
Olympic rowers of West Germany
Rowers at the 1968 Summer Olympics
People from Śrem